The Wainui River is a river of the Tararua District in the Manawatū-Whanganui Region of New Zealand's North Island. The name Wainui means large waters. It is derived from the Maori words wai meaning water and nui meaning large.

Tributaries
The Wainui River has a number of small tributary streams. Tributaries include (west to east): Angora Stream, Wimbledon Stream, Waikopiro Stream, Mangaone Stream, Mangaohau Stream, Tapui Stream, and Wairauka Stream.

See also
List of rivers of New Zealand

References

Rivers of Manawatū-Whanganui
Rivers of New Zealand